Ádám Szörényi (born 9 November 1977) is a Hungarian sailor. He competed in the men's 470 event at the 2000 Summer Olympics.

References

External links
 

1977 births
Living people
Hungarian male sailors (sport)
Olympic sailors of Hungary
Sailors at the 2000 Summer Olympics – 470
Sportspeople from Budapest